FX is a Latin American pay television channel. It is intended as a counterpart to Fox Life (now Star Life), the first being produced for the Young and Adult audience, while the latter is almost entirely programmed for the female viewers. It was launched in May 1, 2005.

In July 2007, Fox's adult animation block, No molestar!, in Spanish or Não perturbe!, in Portuguese (literal: "Do not disturb!"), was extended to FX, featuring series as Family Guy, American Dad!, God, the Devil and Bob and The Wrong Coast, all previously seen on the Fox block. But the block was removed from the channel in 2011.

In 2012, FX launched its own HD feed throughout Latin America.

On November 27, 2020, Disney announced that it would rename the Fox channels in Latin America to Star on 22 February 2021. This change would not affect FX, National Geographic, FXM, Cinecanal or Fox Sports Channels.

Between April and May 2021, after 15 years, Fox's adult animation shows, such as Family Guy, American Dad!, Bob's Burgers and Bless the Harts, were moved from the channel to the STAR+ service. Ever since, only films, series and other programs were broadcast.

Programming 
Primetime
Bones (aired on Star Channel)
Spartacus: Blood and Sand
Spartacus: Gods of the Arena
Dollhouse
The Unit
Dexter
Burn Notice
The Office (dubbed, i.Sat broadcast the subtitled version)
ReGenesis
Reno 911!
The Loop
Stargate SG-1
Stargate Atlantis
Saved
Prison Break
It's Always Sunny in Philadelphia
The League
The Riches
Better Off Ted
The Good Guys
The Chicago Code
Terriers
Wilfred
Homeland
The Bridge
The Americans
Magic City
Tyrant
American Horror Story
The Strain

Sports / Sports Entertainment
NXT
The Ultimate Fighter
European Poker Tour
Ultimate Poker Challenge
High Stakes Poker

Animation
Family Guy
God, the Devil and Bob
American Dad!
The Cleveland Show
The Wrong Coast
City Hunters
Brickleberry
Kung Faux
King of the Hill
Bob's Burgers
Neighbors from Hell
Allen Gregory
Sit Down, Shut Up
Bless the Harts
Napoleon Dynamite

Daytime
The X-Files
Car Cruzin
Innovaciones Tecnologicas
Innov8
How To Blow A Billion
Ultimate Gambler
Gadgets, Gadgets, Gadgets
Car Crazy
TransitMan's WorkMy Name Is EarlGracelandDadsCrisisBen and KateGang RelatedSpeed Channel BlockPinksTwo Guys GarageTruck UniverseLate Nite (Rated TV-MA)Penn & Teller: Bullshit!The Man ShowLa chica FXLa chica FX 2PlayboyzUltimate Poker BabesEmma's A-Z of American SexI Dream of JodieSin CitiesCosta Del SexFamily BusinessG String Divas''

References

Latin America
Television channels and stations established in 2005
Spanish-language television stations
The Walt Disney Company Latin America